Myth and Mythopoeia is an album of contemporary classical music composed by John Zorn and featuring a piece for  string quartet and soprano, one for solo cello, one for a trio of piano, violin and cello, one for a duo of violin and cello and one for full ensemble, which was released on the Tzadik label in June 2014.

Reception

PopMatters reviewer John Garratt stated "I recommend Myth and Mythopoeia solely based on the powerfully mysterious Missa Sine Voces"". You can look at the surrounding pieces in a number of ways—either as gravy, cold side-dishes, distractions, or some nice desserts. But the 13:25 track that summarizes the paradox that is John Zorn is a compelling reason to keep tracing the iconic composer’s career. As uneven and difficult as it is to follow, it’s certainly worth it when things like this happen".

Track listing
All compositions by John Zorn.

 "Pandora's Box" - 13:48   
 "Missa Sine Voces" - 13:25   
 "Zeitgehöft" - 9:15   
 "Babel" - 4:55   
 "Hexentarot" - 6:37

Notes
Recorded at Huddersfield Contemporary Music Festival on November 21, 2013 (track 1), EastSide Sound, NYC on December 20, 2013 (track 3), Miller Theatre Columbia University, NYC on December 26, 2013 (tracks 2 & 5) and Studio G, Brooklyn, NY on April 1, 2014 (track 4).

Personnel
Arditti Quartet (track 1)
Irvine Arditti, Ashot Sarkissjan - violin
Ralf Ehlers - viola
Lucas Fels - cello
Sarah Maria Sun - soprano (track 1)
Talea Ensemble conducted by James Baker (track 2)
Nuiko Wadden - harp
Stephen Beck - piano
 Matthew Ward - vibraphone
Alex Lipowski - bass drum, percussion
Matthew Gold - chimes
Chris Otto - violin (tracks 3 & 5)
Jay Campbell - cello (tracks 3 & 5)
Stephen Gosling - piano (track 5)
Jeff Zeigler - cello (track 4)

Production
Silas Brown, Scott Fraser, Alex Harker, Marc Urselli - engineer, audio mixer
John Zorn and Kazunori Sugiyama – producers

References
 

2014 albums
John Zorn albums
Albums produced by John Zorn
Tzadik Records albums